Gabriel Gobin (12 May 1903 – 9 February 1998) was a Belgian film actor. He appeared in more than 100 films between 1947 and 1990. He was born in Hacquegnies, Belgium and died in Brie-Comte-Robert, France.

Selected filmography

 Quai des Orfèvres (1947) - Le patron du bistrot
 Monsieur Vincent (1947) - Un serviteur de Monsieur Besnier (uncredited)
 Dédée d'Anvers (1948) - Paul
 Une si jolie petite plage (1949) - Arthur
 Monseigneur (1949) - Tatave
 Manèges (1950) - Émile
 Here Is the Beauty (1950) - Le machiniste
 The Paris Waltz (1950) - Chqbert - le régisseur
 Old Boys of Saint-Loup (1950) - Subileau - l'agriculteur
 Identité judiciaire (1951) - Un ouvrier (uncredited)
 Les amants de Bras-Mort (1951) - Marinier
 Passion (1951)
 The Voyage to America (1951) - Employé du car
 Leathernose (1952) - Le piqueur
 The Seven Deadly Sins (1952) - Le gendarme (segment "Luxure, La / Lust") (uncredited)
 We Are All Murderers (1952) - Un gardien (uncredited)
 La jeune folle (1952) - L'employé de la gare
 Crimson Curtain (1952)
 Run Away Mr. Perle (1952) - Un homme au bistrot de Romainville
 Follow That Man (1953) - L'agent Faurel (uncredited)
 Le Secret d'Hélène Marimon (1954)
 The Lovers of Marianne (1954) - Le villageois qui fait du scandale (uncredited)
 Razzia sur la chnouf (1955) - Un client du "Troquet"
 Black Dossier (1955) - Le brigadier
 Girl on the Third Floor (1955) - Un locataire (uncredited)
 The Best Part (1955) - Un joueur de cartes
 People of No Importance (1956) - L'homme de la cabane
 Marie Antoinette Queen of France (1956) - (uncredited)
 Meeting in Paris (1956)
 The Width of the Pavement (1956) - L'ouvrier
 Pardonnez nos offenses (1956)
 Blood to the Head (1956) - Arthur Cardinaud
 Paris, Palace Hotel (1956) - Le brigadier
 Que les hommes sont bêtes (1957)
 Le rouge est mis (1957) - L'inspecteur Bouvard
 Young Girls Beware (1957) - Le médecin
 Trois jours à vivre (1957)
 Comme un cheveu sur la soupe (1957) - Le terrassier devant chez Pierre (uncredited)
 Sinners of Paris (1958) - Le gardien du garage (uncredited)
 Police judiciaire (1958) - Le chauffeur de René le Belge (uncredited)
 Le désordre et la nuit (1958) - L'inspecteur Rocard
 Rapt au deuxième bureau (1958) - Lieutenant Fernand, 2ème Bureau
 Madame et son auto (1958)
 Time Bomb (1959) - Julien Aubriant
 Le grand chef (1959) - Le chauffeur de taxi (uncredited)
 Archimède le clochard (1959) - Le breton (uncredited)
 La bête à l'affût (1959) - L'hôtelier
 Soupe au lait (1959)
 Rue des prairies (1959) - Dubourg
 Signé Arsène Lupin (1959) - L'employé de la SNCF (uncredited)
 La nuit des traqués (1959)
 The Cat Shows Her Claws (1960) - Le conducteur de la locomotive
 The Baron of the Locks (1960) - Valentin
 Les Bonnes Femmes (1960) - Le père d'Henri
 The Old Guard (1960) - Étienne Lesage, employé de la mairie
 It Happened All Night (1960) - Sergeant
 Boulevard (1960)
 The President (1961) - Un gendarme en faction
 The Passion of Slow Fire (1961) - Le sergent de police Ruchet
 Le cave se rebiffe (1961) - L'entraîneur hippique à Vincennes
 A Monkey in Winter (1962) - Un habitué du café
 Trique, gamin de Paris (1962)
 The Mysteries of Paris (1962) - M. Morel, le tailleur
 Five Miles to Midnight (1962) 
 Le glaive et la balance (1963) - Albert, le concierge du Palais
 Any Number Can Win (1963) - Un voyageur du train (uncredited)
 The Day and the Hour (1963) - L'employé du chemin de fer
 Diary of a Chambermaid (1964) - Le brigadier qui vient arrêter Joseph
 Up from the Beach (1965) - Trombonist
 The Dirty Game (1965) - O'Hara
 Les Bons Vivants (1965) - Maître Leproux (segment "Les bons vivants")
 Le caïd de Champignol (1966) - Larivière
 Mademoiselle (1966) - Police Sergeant
 La Grande Vadrouille (1966) - Le machiniste résistant de l'opéra
 The Thief of Paris (1967) - Le père Visin
 The Oldest Profession (1967) - Un monsieur choqué (segment "Aujourd'hui") (uncredited)
 Les risques du métier (1967) - Le juge d'instruction
 The Milky Way (1969) - Father
 Les gros malins (1969) - Le président des courses
 La Horse (1970) - Le brigadier 
 La nuit bulgare (1970)
 Le petit matin (1971) - Un marin
 Ben et Bénédict (1977) - Le vieux voisin
 Inspecteur la Bavure (1980) - L'avocat du satyre
 Diva (1981)
 Tandem (1987) - Old barman
 L'invité surprise (1989) - Le vieil homme

References

External links

1903 births
1998 deaths
Belgian male film actors
20th-century Belgian male actors